Ralph Gebhardt is a retired American football coach and player.  He was the head coach at St. John Fisher College from 1987 to 1990.

As a collegiate player at the University of Rochester, Gebhardt was a standout defensive back, earning All-American honors in 1973, 1974, and 1975. He set NCAA records for most touchdowns scored on interceptions in one season (3 in 1974) as well as most interceptions in a career (34 from 1972 to 1975).

Head coaching record

College

References

External links
 University of Rochester Hall of Fame profile

Year of birth missing (living people)
Living people
American football defensive backs
Rochester Yellowjackets football players
St. John Fisher Cardinals football coaches